Joyful Noise is a 2012 American musical comedy-drama film, starring Queen Latifah, Dolly Parton, Keke Palmer, Jeremy Jordan, and Courtney B. Vance. It was written and directed by Todd Graff, with gospel-infused music by Mervyn Warren. The film was released in U.S. theaters on January 13, 2012. In the film, two strong-minded women are forced to cooperate when budget cuts threaten to shut down a small-town choir. The film received mixed reviews, with praise for its songs and acting but criticism of its script and tone.

Plot
After the untimely death of a small-town church choir director Bernard Sparrow, (Kris Kristofferson) in Pacashau, Georgia, Vi Rose Hill (Queen Latifah), a practical mother raising two teenagers alone, takes control of the choir using the traditional Gospel style that their Pastor Dale (Courtney B. Vance) approves of. However, the director's widow, G. G. Sparrow (Dolly Parton), the main benefactor to the church, believes she should have been given the position. As in previous years, the choir reaches the regional finals of the national amateur "Joyful Noise" competition, only to be disappointed when a rival choir beats them. Tough times in the town have led to budget problems that threaten to close down the choir, at a time when the town needs the choir's inspiring music more than ever.

Vi Rose has a son, Walter (Dexter Darden), who has Asperger syndrome, and a talented, beautiful and independent daughter, Olivia (Keke Palmer), who detests being under her mother's household rules. G. G. has recently begun caring for her rebellious, drifter grandson, Randy (Jeremy Jordan). A romance blossoms between Olivia and Randy, which is strongly opposed by Vi Rose. Olivia also has a rival suitor, Manny (Paul Woolfolk). At Randy's urging, G. G., Olivia and most of the choir come to believe that some more contemporary arrangements (prepared by Randy) would be more successful for the choir. It also turns out that the choir has a chance at the national finals of the competition when the rival choir is found to have cheated by hiring professionals. But the pastor says that the church will not sponsor the choir unless they continue to use their reverent, traditional style.

Vi Rose's husband, Marcus (Jesse L. Martin), enlisted in the army after having trouble finding work at home, but his prolonged absence has saddened his family and causes additional tension between Vi Rose and Olivia. Meanwhile, a vivacious member of the choir who choreographs their routines, Earla (Angela Grovey), after a long dry stretch, finds passion first with Mr. Hsu (Francis Jue), whose weak heart gives way by morning, and later with Justin (Roy Huang). The town's tough times forces another choir member, Caleb (Andy Karl), and his family out of business. Vi Rose and G. G. come to blows in a confrontation at a crowded diner where Vi Rose is then fired from her job, Olivia's frustration with her mother boils over, and G. G. threatens Pastor Dale with disendowing the church if the choir is not allowed to compete in the finals with the new arrangements.

During the movie, Randy befriends Walter and begins to teach him how to play the piano. One day, while at the quarry Randy and Walter are hanging out as Manny arrives. Randy and Manny begin to fight over Olivia ending with Randy giving Manny a bloody nose. When returning home, Walter brags to Vi Rose about the fight. Angered by the news, she throws out Randy and tells him to leave her family alone. However Olivia and Randy continue seeing each other and G.G. assures them Vi will come around.  Their first competition is Holy Vision Church of Detroit which has won three times, however they are rightfully suspicious of their rival as the singers are different from the video and they have 10 hours of rehearsal everyday. However, G.G. found out that Detroit actually hired paid professionals in their choir which is against the rules.  Meanwhile Randy is able to befriend Manny and convince him to help out the choir with his guitar skills.

The choir travels to Los Angeles for the finals, feeling very unsettled. Vi Rose and Olivia have a fight and Vi Rose slaps Olivia. Tough competition presents itself in the form of a choir made up of cute pre-teens, with a charismatic young soloist (Ivan Kelley Jr.). But Vi Rose, G.G., Olivia and Randy pull the choir together and they give a rousing performance, using the new arrangements and choreography, capturing first place. The choir returns to town in triumph. One year later, Earla and Justin get married and then Marcus comes back to his family.

Cast

 Queen Latifah as Vi Rose Hill, Olivia's mother.
 Dolly Parton as G. G. Sparrow, Randy's maternal grandmother.
 Keke Palmer as Olivia Hill, Vi Rose's daughter and Randy's love interest.
 Jeremy Jordan as Randy Garrity, Sparrow's grandson and Olivia's love interest.
 Dexter Darden as Walter Hill, Vi Rose's son and Olivia's older brother.
 Courtney B. Vance as Pastor Dale
 Kris Kristofferson as Bernard Sparrow, G. G.'s late husband and Randy's late maternal grandfather.
 Jesse L. Martin as Marcus Hill, Vi Rose's estranged husband and Olivia's father.
 Angela Grovey as Earla Hughes, the choir's choreographer.
 Andy Karl as Caleb, a choir member whose family loses its business.
 Dequina Moore as Devonne, a talkative choir member.
 Paul Woolfolk as Manny, a young guitarist with an interest in Olivia. 
 Francis Jue as Ang Hsu, a choir member who is attracted to Earla.
 Roy Huang as Justin, Earla's second lover.
 Judd Lormand as Officer Darrel Lino
 Shameik Moore as Our Lady of Perpetual Tears choir master
 Ivan Kelley Jr. as the soloist of the Our Lady of Perpetual Tears choir.
 Kirk Franklin as Baylor Sykes, the choir leader for a rival church.
 Karen Peck as competition host, lead singer "Mighty High"
 Chloe Bailey as a choir member of Our Lady of Perpetual Tears

Production
Joyful Noise began filming in February 2011, in locations throughout Georgia, such as Atlanta, Decatur, Newnan, Dallas, Conyers, Peachtree City, and historic Howard's Restaurant in Smyrna. The movie finished filming in early April 2011.

Soundtrack

The movie has twelve songs inspired by the film under the name Joyful Noise Original Motion Picture Soundtrack including "Fix Me, Jesus", "In Love", "Higher Medley" and more. The soundtrack is performed by the stars of the movie. Dolly Parton wrote three of the songs, including "Not Enough", "From Here To The Moon and Back", and "He's Everything."

Reception

Critical reaction 
On Rotten Tomatoes the film has an approval rating of 32% based on 129 reviews, with an average rating of 4.70/10. The website's critical consensus reads, "Joyful Noises musical numbers are solidly entertaining, and it benefits from Queen Latifah and Dolly Parton's sizable chemistry; unfortunately, they aren't enough to make up for the rest of the film." On Metacritic, the film has a score of 44 out of 100, indicating "mixed or average reviews".

Roger Ebert of the Chicago Sun-Times described the film as "an ungainly assembly of parts that don't fit, and the strange thing is that it makes no particular effort to please its target audience, which would seem to be lovers of gospel choirs." Christy Lemire of The Boston Globe felt that "if some incarnation of Glee were to be developed for the Christian Broadcasting Network, it would probably look a lot like Joyful Noise. Peter Debruge of Variety claims that "despite the sheer volume of music on offer, very little of it feels authentic – or especially inspiring." Todd McCarthy of The Hollywood Reporter felt that everyone in the film "is so fundamentally decent and goody-goody that no real tension or unresolvable conflicts ever surface."

Some critics found positive things to say about the film. Richard Corliss of Time magazine stated that "the critic in me can authoritatively declare that the film is crap. The fan in me sent his shirt to the dry cleaners for tear removal." Owen Gleiberman of Entertainment Weekly felt that "the movie's musical numbers are catchy and rollicking and, in their bright sunshiny way, rather soulful." Rex Reed of The New York Observer stated, "Don't expect high art, and you will leave Joyful Noise smiling to the beat."

The film won the 2012 Inspirational Country Music Awards' Faith, Family, & Country Movie of the Year.

Box office
The movie did manage to recoup, grossing $31.2 million against a $25 million production budget. It opened at #4 at the weekend box office, grossing $11.2 million on its opening weekend, and was screened in 2,735 theaters during its run.

See also
The Fighting Temptations
Sister Act
Let It Shine
List of black films of the 2010s

References

External links
 
 
 
 
 

2012 films
2010s musical comedy-drama films
Alcon Entertainment films
African-American comedy-drama films
African-American musical films
American musical comedy-drama films
Films about autism
Films about Christianity
Films directed by Todd Graff
Films set in Georgia (U.S. state)
Films shot in Georgia (U.S. state)
Warner Bros. films
2012 comedy films
2012 drama films
2010s English-language films
2010s American films